Marvis Frazier (born September 12, 1960) is an American former professional boxer who fought in the heavyweight division.

Early life
Marvis is the son of former heavyweight champion and Hall of Famer, Joe Frazier. Marvis was at ringside for all of his father's fights after the second Oscar Bonavena bout in December 1968, including the great fights with Muhammad Ali. Marvis exhibited four rounds with his father in Rochester, New York, on December 3, 1976, and staged another exhibition in 1977.) His sister Jackie Frazier-Lyde was also a professional boxer, as was his brother Joe Frazier, Jr. (a.k.a. Hector Frazier). Marvis lived with his family in a 16-room stone split-level home in Whitemarsh.

Marvis was involved in other sports, but finally gave it all up in favor of boxing, "I played football and basketball and I wrestled, and I love them all, especially football. I was a running back. When I was in ninth grade, Duke and Temple talked to me about going there. But I fell so much in love with boxing. I gave up the other sports. Once I get into a sport. I dedicate myself to it. I don't believe in concentrating on more than one thing," Marvis Frazier said on his choice of boxing. He graduated from Plymouth-Whitemarsh High School in suburban Philadelphia

Amateur career
Marvis was a highly touted prospect and among the top-ranked amateur heavyweights. He was the 1979 National Golden Gloves Heavyweight Champion and 1980 National AAU Heavyweight Champion.  He was coached partly by his father, and in part by Georgie Benton and Val Colbert. "My dad tried not to play too active a role in my career for fear of putting pressure on me," Marvis said. Benton said that Marvis was a model kid. He grew up "like he was poor". According to Benton, "there were no favors. When the grass on the Fraziers' two-and-a-half acre plot needed cutting, Marvis did it. With a hand mower. He goes to choir practice Monday nights, Bible study Wednesday nights and church on Sunday. He doesn't smoke, drink or run around. Not because such strictures are demanded of him, but because that's the way he is boxing or no boxing."

His amateur debut came on March 4, 1977, age 16, with a unanimous decision victory over David Bey in Philadelphia.

In February 1979, Frazier was ranked #2 U.S. amateur heavyweight by the U.S. Amateur Boxers and Coaches Association, and #1 by the Amateur Athletic Union. Frazier was a runner-up for the 1979 Pan American Games, where he was expected to meet Teófilo Stevenson for the first time in this competition. He was concentrating on the Pan American trials and the Pan Am games, after that, he was aiming for a shot at the Olympics. "That's my goal," he said, but ultimately did not take part in the Pan Am trials on the advice of his father. Joe Frazier thought his 19-year-old son was still too young and inexperienced to meet Stevenson. Marvis didn't show at the 1979 National Sports Festival in Colorado Springs, Colorado, because his father insisted that they send airplane tickets for an accompanying entourage of three people with all expenses paid. Frazier also pulled out of the World Cup, staged in New York, in October 1979, for the event was largely neglected after Cuba was banned from participation after refusing to team-up with the U.S. to form the "North American team" to compete versus European and other world's athletes.

Frazier intended to fly on LOT Polish Airlines Flight 7, where several of his teammates were killed, but his father always avoided flying, and forbade his son to fly as well. Frazier said of this experience:

Among his best amateur wins were against future pro contender Mitch Green, and future champs Tim Witherspoon, and Bonecrusher Smith. He also decisioned amateur star Jimmy Clark (the #2 ranked amateur heavyweight in the country.) He was KOd by James Broad, a man "I know nothing about," in the 1980 Olympic Trials finals.

Highlights

 Philadelphia Golden Gloves, Philadelphia, Pennsylvania, March 1977 (amateur debut):
Defeated David Bey by unanimous decision, 5–0
 Pennsylvania Golden Gloves, novice division, Palestra, Philadelphia, Pennsylvania, March 1977:
1/2: Defeated John Owens by decision
Finals: Defeated Jarrett Smith KO 1
 Pennsylvania Golden Gloves, Civic Arena, Pittsburgh, Pennsylvania, March 1978:
Finals: Defeated Ed Bednarik by majority decision, 4–1 
Local match-up, New Jersey, 1978:
Defeated (no data available) RSC 2
Local match-up, Frazier's Gym, Philadelphia, Pennsylvania, 1978:
Defeated (no data available) KO 1 
Indiana vs. Pennsylvania Golden Glovers match-up, Tyndall Armory, Indianapolis, Indiana, August 1978:
Defeated (no data available) KO 2
 Boxing at the Ohio State Fair, Columbus, Ohio, August 1978:
Defeated William Hosea by split decision, 2–1
Illinois–Kentucky–Pennsylvania Golden Glovers match-up, Dunlap, Pennsylvania, October 1978:
Defeated Keith Little by decision
 Philadelphia Golden Gloves, Philadelphia, Pennsylvania, February–March 1979:
1/2: Defeated Tim Witherspoon by decision
Finals: Defeated James Smith by decision
 Eastern Golden Gloves, Liberty Bell Park, Philadelphia, Pennsylvania, March 1979:
Finals: Defeated Jimmy Clark by unanimous decision, 5–0
 Pennsylvania Golden Gloves, Palestra, Philadelphia, Pennsylvania, March 1979:
Finals: Defeated Ed Bednarik KO 1 

 National Golden Gloves, Convention Center, Indianapolis, Indiana, March 1979:
1/16: Defeated Charles Archie KO 1 
1/8: Defeated Bryon Westmoreland by decision 
1/4: Defeated Walter Ware by technical walkover
1/2: Defeated William Hosea by decision 
Finals: Defeated Philip Brown by decision
Frazier vs. Ali teams match-up, Resorts International Hotel Casino, Atlantic City, New Jersey, May 1979:
Defeated Tony Tubbs by split decision, 2–1
Frazier vs. Sports For Boys team, Municipal Auditorium, New Orleans, Louisiana, July 1979:
Defeated Robert Lavarry
Frazier vs. Clarion team, Tippin Gymnasium, Clarion, Pennsylvania, October 1979:
Defeated Jerome Boyd
Florida vs. Pennsylvania Golden Glovers match-up, Coliseum, Jacksonville, Florida, November 1979:
Defeated Jeff Foster KO 1
 Junior World Championships, Yokohama, Japan, December 1979:
1/4: Defeated Daniel Goguen (Canada) KO 2
1/2: Defeated Alexander Yagubkin (Soviet Union) by unanimous decision, 5–0
Finals: Defeated Olaf Mayer (Austria) RSC 2 
Frazier vs. Ali teams match-up, Houston, Texas, February 1980:
Lost to Tony Tubbs by decision
 National Championships, Caesars Palace, Las Vegas, Nevada, May 1980:
Finals: Defeated Chris McDonald by decision
Olympic Trials, Atlanta, Georgia, June 1980:
1/4: Defeated Mitch Green by unanimous decision, 5–0
1/2: Lost to James Broad KO 1 

His amateur record was 56 wins and 2 losses.

Marvis promised there will be no pro career. "If I can get that Olympic medal, that's it. I'm going to college (Peirce Junior College in Philadelphia,) and then get in business," he said in 1979. But trainer Georgie Benton saw greater potential, "He's on the road to being a defensive genius. Give me 18 months and I'll have him looking like another Houdini. If you hit him with one hand, you better forget about hitting him with that hand again. You might as well put it in your pocket He can do whatever the situation calls for. He's 18, and he's doing some things the top contenders don't do. Wait until he matures and develops a man's strength," Benton said. Benton, predicted Marvis Frazier will be "the greatest heavyweight since Joe Louis."

Professional career
As a professional, Frazier is best remembered for two first-round knockout losses: a technical knockout from champion Larry Holmes in 1983 and a knockout by rising Mike Tyson in 1986. Pitted against Holmes after just ten professional fights (all victories), Frazier's camp touted his speed and youth as significant advantages over the champion. During the first minute, Frazier taunted Holmes by dropping his hands to his sides and playfully moving his head back and forth. Holmes knocked down  Frazier with a  right lead two minutes into the fight. Frazier took an eight-count and got back up. Frazier, badly hurt, absorbed heavy punches from Holmes, who appealed for the referee to stop the fight. Finally, the referee stopped the fight with just a few seconds left in the first round. Many in the sports press criticized Frazier's father, Joe Frazier, for changing his son's style from that of an out-fighter (which brought Marvis success as an amateur) to an in-fighter, which many thought did not suit Marvis.

After his loss to Holmes, Frazier continued to fight and won his next six matches, including victories over future world cruiserweight champion Bernard Benton, heavyweight contenders José Ribalta and James Tillis, and future champion James "Bonecrusher" Smith. With the exception of a first-round knockout in his first fight after losing to Holmes, all of Frazier's fights went the full ten round distance with him winning unanimous or majority decisions in each fight.

This set up the fight with the 24–0 Tyson, which was broadcast live from the Glens Falls Civic Center in Glens Falls, New York by ABC. Frazier quickly proved to be outmatched as Tyson landed a huge uppercut then followed with a combination that left Frazier unconscious. Referee Joe Cortez started to count while looking at Frazier, but immediately waved off the fight once he saw that Frazier was not responsive. The 30-second fight is Tyson's quickest knockout of his career.

Recalling the fight in later years, Frazier conceded that he had underestimated Tyson. "Tyson was just another guy who was going to be a statistic. Yeah, that's what I thought. I threw a jab and that's all I remember."

After Tyson, Frazier did not fight for a title again. After nearly a year away from the ring, Frazier returned to fight twice in two months, winning both of his fights over journeymen fighters. He won his final fight against Phillipp Brown in 1988, retiring with a career record of 19–2.

Retirement and later life
After retiring from boxing, he became an ordained minister and active participant in Prison Fellowship Ministries. Frazier appeared on The Howard Stern Show with his father to promote HBO's Thrilla in Manila documentary on April 2, 2009.

In 2013 Frazier completed his autobiography, Meet Marvis Frazier: The Story of the Son of Smokin' Joe, with co-author Jamie Potter.

Professional boxing record

|-
|align="center" colspan=8|19 Wins (8 knockouts, 11 decisions), 2 Losses (2 knockouts)
|-
| align="center" style="border-style: none none solid solid; background: #e3e3e3"|Res.
| align="center" style="border-style: none none solid solid; background: #e3e3e3"|Record
| align="center" style="border-style: none none solid solid; background: #e3e3e3"|Opponent
| align="center" style="border-style: none none solid solid; background: #e3e3e3"|Type
| align="center" style="border-style: none none solid solid; background: #e3e3e3"|Rd., Time
| align="center" style="border-style: none none solid solid; background: #e3e3e3"|Date
| align="center" style="border-style: none none solid solid; background: #e3e3e3"|Location
| align="center" style="border-style: none none solid solid; background: #e3e3e3"|Notes
|-align=center
|Win
|19–2
|Philipp Brown
|UD
|10
|1988-10-12
|align=left|Tucson, Arizona
|
|-align=center
|Win
|18–2
|Robert Evans
|UD
|10
|1987-08-10
|align=left|Secaucus, New Jersey
|
|-align=center
|Win
|17–2
|Tom Fischer
|TKO
|2 (10), 
|1987-06-01
|align=left|Secaucus, New Jersey
|
|-align=center
|Loss
|16–2
|Mike Tyson
|KO
|1 (10), 
|1986-07-26
|align=left|Glens Falls, New York
|
|-align=center
|Win
|16–1
|James Smith
|UD
|10
|1986-02-23
|align=left|Richmond, California
|
|-align=center
|Win
|15–1
|José Ribalta
|MD
|10
|1985-09-11
|align=left|Atlantic City, New Jersey
|
|-align=center
|Win
|14–1
|James Tillis
|UD
|10
|1985-05-20
|align=left|Reno, Nevada
|
|-align=center
|Win
|13–1
|Funso Banjo
|PTS
|10
|1984-12-05
|align=left|London, UK
|
|-align=center
|Win
|12–1
|Bernard Benton
|UD
|10
|1984-10-23
|align=left|Atlantic City, New Jersey
|
|-align=center
|Win
|11–1
|David Starkey
|TKO
|1 (8), 
|1984-09-25
|align=left|Pennsauken, New Jersey
|
|-align=center
|Loss
|10–1
|Larry Holmes
|TKO
|1 (12), 
|1983-11-25
|align=left|Las Vegas, Nevada
|style="text-align:left;"|
|-align=center
|Win
|10–0
|Joe Bugner
|UD
|10
|1983-06-04
|align=left|Atlantic City, New Jersey
|
|-align=center
|Win
|9–0
|James Broad
|UD
|10
|1983-04-10
|align=left|Atlantic City, New Jersey
|
|-align=center
|Win
|8–0
|Mike Cohen
|KO
|2 
|1983-03-07
|align=left|Charleston, South Carolina
|
|-align=center
|Win
|7–0
|Amos Haynes
|TKO
|5 (10), 
|1983-02-08
|align=left|Atlantic City, New Jersey
|
|-align=center
|Win
|6–0
|Guy Casale
|RTD
|4 (8), 
|1981-09-16
|align=left|Las Vegas, Nevada
|
|-align=center
|Win
|5–0
|Tony Pulu
|UD
|6
|1981-08-22
|align=left|Las Vegas, Nevada
|
|-align=center
|Win
|4–0
|Steve Zouski
|KO 
|6 (6), 
|1981-05-11
|align=left|New York, New York
|
|-align=center
|Win
|3–0
|Melvin Epps
|UD
|6
|1981-04-10
|align=left|New York, New York
|
|-align=center
|Win
|2–0
|Dennis Rivera
|TKO
|2 (4), 
|1980-10-10
|align=left|New York, New York
|
|-align=center
|Win
|1–0
|Roger Troupe
|TKO
|3 (4), 
|1980-09-12
|align=left|New York, New York
|
|-

References

External links
 
 Amateur career of Marvis Frazier (in Spanish) compiled by Pedro Cabrera Isidrón of the Cuban Olympics Committee.
 Meet Marvis Frazier
 Marvis Frazier's Facebook page

1960 births
Living people
Heavyweight boxers
African-American boxers
Boxers from Philadelphia
National Golden Gloves champions
Winners of the United States Championship for amateur boxers
American male boxers
21st-century African-American people
20th-century African-American sportspeople